Rötmånad (American title: Dog Days, British title: What Are You Doing After the Orgy?) is a Swedish dark comedy film from 1970 directed by Jan Halldoff.

In the Stockholm archipelago lives the barber Assar Gustafsson (played by Carl-Gustaf Lindstedt) peacefully with his 17-year-old daughter Anna-Bella (played by Christina Lindberg). One day Assar's wife Sally (Ulla Sjöblom) comes back after five years of absence and she starts up a brothel with the young girl as the main attraction.

The film contains a lot of nudity and violence, but also a lot of humor, and has achieved cult film status in Sweden. In 2014, SF released it on DVD as part of Fyra klassiska filmer av Jan Halldoff box set.

Cast  
Carl-Gustaf Lindstedt ... Assar Gustafsson
Ulla Sjöblom ... Sally Gustafsson 
Christina Lindberg ... Anna Bella Gustafsson
Ernst Günther... Jansson 
Eddie Axberg ... Jan 
Jan Blomberg ... Photographer

External links 

1970 films
1970s Swedish-language films
1970s black comedy films
Films directed by Jan Halldoff
Swedish black comedy films
1970 comedy films
1970 drama films
1970s Swedish films